FIFA Club of the Century was an award presented by FIFA to decide the best football club of the 20th century. Real Madrid was the winner of the award with 42.35% of the vote, announced at the annual FIFA World gala, held in Rome on 11 December 2000. Madrid was the most successful club in international football at the time, having amassed eight European Cups and two Intercontinental Cups.

During the ceremony, Alfredo Di Stéfano and Florentino Pérez collected the trophy which was presented to Real Madrid. For the 2006–07 season a crest was added to Real Madrid's shirts, commemorating their status as FIFA Club of the Century.

Results
The voting system used for the award, was restricted to subscribers of the bi-monthly FIFA World Magazine (FIFA's official magazine).

References

External links
The FIFA Club of the Century

Clubs of the 20th Century
History of association football
Awards established in 2000